Chitin (C8H13O5N)n is a long-chain polymer of N-acetylglucosamine, an amide derivative of glucose. Chitin is probably the second most abundant polysaccharide in nature (behind only cellulose); an estimated 1 billion tons of chitin are produced each year in the biosphere. It is a primary component of cell walls in fungi (especially basidiomycetes and filamentous fungi), the exoskeletons of arthropods such as crustaceans and insects, the radulae, cephalopod beaks and gladii of molluscs and in some nematodes and diatoms.
It is also synthesised by at least some fish and lissamphibians. Commercially, chitin is extracted from the shells of crabs, shrimps, shellfish and lobsters, which are major by-products of the seafood industry. The structure of chitin is comparable to cellulose, forming crystalline nanofibrils or whiskers. It is functionally comparable to the protein keratin. Chitin has proved useful for several medicinal, industrial and biotechnological purposes.

Etymology
The English word "chitin" comes from the French word chitine, which was derived in 1821 from the Greek word χιτών (khitōn) meaning covering.

A similar word, "chiton", refers to a marine animal with a protective shell.

Chemistry, physical properties and biological function 

The structure of chitin was determined by Albert Hofmann in 1929. Hofmann hydrolyzed chitin using a crude preparation of the enzyme chitinase, which he obtained from the snail Helix pomatia.

Chitin is a modified polysaccharide that contains nitrogen; it is synthesized from units of N-acetyl-D-glucosamine (to be precise, 2-(acetylamino)-2-deoxy-D-glucose). These units form covalent β-(1→4)-linkages (like the linkages between glucose units forming cellulose). Therefore, chitin may be described as cellulose with one hydroxyl group on each monomer replaced with an acetyl amine group. This allows for increased hydrogen bonding between adjacent polymers, giving the chitin-polymer matrix increased strength.

In its pure, unmodified form, chitin is translucent, pliable, resilient, and quite tough. In most arthropods, however, it is often modified, occurring largely as a component of composite materials, such as in sclerotin, a tanned proteinaceous matrix, which forms much of the exoskeleton of insects. Combined with calcium carbonate, as in the shells of crustaceans and molluscs, chitin produces a much stronger composite. This composite material is much harder and stiffer than pure chitin, and is tougher and less brittle than pure calcium carbonate. Another difference between pure and composite forms can be seen by comparing the flexible body wall of a caterpillar (mainly chitin) to the stiff, light elytron of a beetle (containing a large proportion of sclerotin).

In butterfly wing scales, chitin is organized into stacks of gyroids constructed of chitin photonic crystals that produce various iridescent colors serving phenotypic signaling and communication for mating and foraging. The elaborate chitin gyroid construction in butterfly wings creates a model of optical devices having potential for innovations in biomimicry. Scarab beetles in the genus Cyphochilus also utilize chitin to form extremely thin scales (five to fifteen micrometres thick) that diffusely reflect white light. These scales are networks of randomly ordered filaments of chitin with diameters on the scale of hundreds of nanometres, which serve to scatter light. The multiple scattering of light is thought to play a role in the unusual whiteness of the scales. In addition, some social wasps, such as Protopolybia chartergoides, orally secrete material containing predominantly chitin to reinforce the outer nest envelopes, composed of paper.

Chitosan is produced commercially by deacetylation of chitin; chitosan is soluble in water, while chitin is not.

Nanofibrils have been made using chitin and chitosan.

Humans and other mammals
Humans and other mammals have chitinase and chitinase-like proteins that can degrade chitin; they also possess several immune receptors that can recognize chitin and its degradation products, initiating an immune response.

Chitin is sensed mostly in the lungs or gastrointestinal tract where it can activate the innate immune system through eosinophils or  macrophages, as well as an adaptive immune response through T helper cells. Keratinocytes in skin can also react to chitin or chitin fragments.

Plants
Plants also have receptors that can cause a response to chitin, namely chitin elicitor receptor kinase 1 and chitin elicitor-binding protein.  The first chitin receptor was cloned in 2006.  When the receptors are activated by chitin, genes related to plant defense are expressed, and jasmonate hormones are activated, which in turn activate systematic defenses.  Commensal fungi have ways to interact with the host immune response that, were not well understood.

Some pathogens produce chitin-binding proteins that mask the chitin they shed from these receptors. Zymoseptoria tritici is an example of a fungal pathogen that has such blocking proteins; it is a major pest in wheat crops.

Fossil record

Chitin was probably present in the exoskeletons of Cambrian arthropods such as trilobites.

Uses

Agriculture 
Chitin is a good inducer of plant defense mechanisms for controlling diseases. It has potential for use as a soil fertilizer or conditioner to improve fertility and plant resilience that may enhance crop yields.

Industrial 
Chitin is used in many industrial processes. Examples of the potential uses of chemically modified chitin in food processing include the formation of edible films and as an additive to thicken and stabilize foods and food emulsions. Processes to size and strengthen paper employ chitin and chitosan.

Research
How chitin interacts with the immune system of plants and animals has been an active area of research, including the identity of key receptors with which chitin interacts, whether the size of chitin particles is relevant to the kind of immune response triggered, and mechanisms by which immune systems respond. Chitin is deacetylated  chemically or enzymatically to produce chitosan, a highly biocompatible polymer which has found a wide range of applications in the biomedical industry. Chitin and chitosan have been explored as a vaccine adjuvant due to its ability to stimulate an immune response.

Chitin and chitosan are under development as scaffolds in studies of how tissue grows and how wounds heal, and in efforts to invent better bandages, surgical thread, and materials for allotransplantation. Sutures made of chitin have been explored for many years, but , none were on the market; their lack of elasticity and problems making thread have prevented commercial development.

In 2014, a method for using chitosan as a reproducible form of biodegradable plastic was introduced. Chitin nanofibers are extracted from crustacean waste and mushrooms for possible development of products in tissue engineering, drug delivery and medicine.

In 2020, chitin was proposed for use in building structures, tools, and other solid objects from a composite material of chitin combined with Martian regolith. In this scenario, the biopolymers in the chitin act as the binder for the regolith aggregate to form a concrete-like composite material. The authors believe that waste materials from food production (e.g. scales from fish, exoskeletons from crustaceans and insects, etc.) could be put to use as feedstock for manufacturing processes.

See also
 Biopesticide
 Chitosan
 Chitobiose
 Lorica
 Sporopollenin
 Tectin

References 

Acetamides
Biomolecules
Biopesticides
Polysaccharides